Janice is a village and municipality in the Rimavská Sobota District of the Banská Bystrica Region of southern Slovakia.

History
On paper it is noticed in 1217 and in 1431 under the name Jeney. It consists of 2 parts - Čikovo (Czikóháza) and Janice. From the beginning it belonged to the yeoman's family of Jeney (local feudatories), then to the Fügeys and Széchys. The originally village burnt out in the 16th century and later it was established on present area. During travelling through Gemer, Matej Korvín came to a stop there supposedly, and according to that event, a part of the area „Čelo Mateja Korvína“ is named. 
It belonged to Hungary till Trianon

Genealogical resources

The records for genealogical research are available at the state archive "Statny Archiv in Banska Bystrica, Slovakia"

 Reformated church records (births/marriages/deaths): 1714-1897 (parish B)

See also
 List of municipalities and towns in Slovakia

External links
https://web.archive.org/web/20071027094149/http://www.statistics.sk/mosmis/eng/run.html
http://www.janice.gemer.org
Surnames of living people in Janice

Villages and municipalities in Rimavská Sobota District